Héctor Hernández García (6 December 1935 – 15 June 1984) was a Mexican professional footballer who played as a forward.

Life and career
He was born in Mexico. He played for Selección de fútbol de México (Mexico national team) in the 1962 FIFA World Cup. He also played for Guadalajara.

International goals
Scores and results list Mexico's goal tally first.

References

External links

1935 births
1984 deaths
Mexican footballers
Mexico international footballers
Association football forwards
C.D. Guadalajara footballers
1962 FIFA World Cup players
Mexico national football team managers
C.D. Guadalajara managers
Mexican football managers